Oxypertine (Equipertine, Forit, Integrin, Lanturil, Lotawin, Opertil) is an antipsychotic used in the treatment of schizophrenia. It was also evaluated for the treatment of anxiety at a dosage of 20 mg per day. Chemically, it is an indole and phenylpiperazine derivative. Like reserpine and tetrabenazine, oxypertine depletes catecholamines, though not serotonin, possibly underlying its neuroleptic efficacy. Its structure is similar to solypertine and milipertine.

See also
 Monoamine-depleting agent

References

Antipsychotics
Catechol ethers
Indole ethers at the benzene ring
Monoamine-depleting agents
Phenylpiperazines
Tryptamines